DYSP Sibi Thomas is an Indian police officer and actor. He appears in Malayalam films. Having made his debut with Thondimuthalum Driksakshiyum in 2017. He is the Deputy Superintendent of Police in Kerala Police Service.

Personal life
Sibi Thomas was born in Kanhangad, Kasaragod, Kerala. He graduated in BSc Chemistry from Nirmalagiri College, Kannur. After graduation, he  joined the Kerala Police in 2003 as Sub Inspector.

Filmography

As actor

As writer

References

External links 
 

1972 births
Living people